Henri de Lorraine (20 March 1601 – 25 July 1666, Royaumont Abbey), known as Cadet la Perle, was a French nobleman. He was count of Harcourt, count of Armagnac, count of Brionne and viscount of Marsan. He was the younger son of Charles I, Duke of Elbeuf and his wife Marguerite de Chabot, countess of Charny.

Life 
He did his first military service at the siege of Prague in November 1620 and because of his bravery he was nicknamed Cadet la Perle by his companions after the pearl he wore in his ear.   

In France he fought the Protestants and took part in the Siege of La Rochelle (1627–1628) and Saint-Jean-d'Angély. He was made a knight in the Order of the Holy Spirit in 1633, Grand Squire of France in 1643 and Seneschal of Burgundy.

In 1637 he fought in Piedmont during the Franco-Spanish War (1635-1659), where he defeated a Spanish army, very superieur in numbers near Chieri. He was also in charge of the Siege of Turin (1640), where he took the city after a siege of three months. He then fought in Sardinia and Catalonia, where he was named viceroy in 1645.

During the Fronde, he remained loyal to the regent-queen Anne of Austria, but clashed with Mazarin, and retreated in the Alsace.

Marriage and issue 

Henri married, in February 1639, Marguerite-Philippe du Cambout (1622–74), and had:
 Armande Henriette (1640–1684), abbess of Soissons
 Louis, Count of Armagnac (1641–1718), of Charny and of Brionne
 Philippe (1643–1702), called chevalier de Lorraine and lover of Philippe I, Duke of Orléans
 Alfonse Louis (1644–1689), abbot of Royaumont, called chevalier d'Harcourt
 Raimond Bérenger (1647–1686), abbot of Faron de Meaux
 Charles (1648–1708), Viscount then Count of Marsan

References

Sources

External links 

1601 births
1666 deaths
House of Lorraine
House of Guise
Counts of Armagnac
Grand Squires of France
Burials at Saint-Roch, Paris
Counts of Harcourt
French military personnel
Princes of Lorraine
17th-century French people
French people of Lorrainian descent
Military personnel of the Franco-Spanish War (1635–1659)